The 2012–13 Lokomotiv Moscow season involved the club competing in the Russian Premier League and Russian Cup. It was Slaven Bilić's first season as manager and ended with the worst league result of the team (9th, the lower part of the table) since establishing of Russian Championship in 1992. As a result, the contract of Bilić was terminated by mutual agreement on 17 June 2013.

First team squad

Transfers

In: Summer transfer window 2012

In: Winter transfer window 2013

Out: Summer transfer window 2012

Out: Winter transfer window 2013

Competitions

Legend

Russian Premier League

Results by matchday

Results

Table

Russian Cup

Squad statistics

Appearances and goals

|-
|colspan="14"|Players who appeared for Lokomotiv no longer at the club:

|}

Scorers and assistants

Disciplinary record

Season events
During winter camp at Cyprus in February 2013, Guilherme was appointed team captain instead of Denis Glushakov who started 2012-2013 season with captain's armband. Roman Shishkin and Dmitri Tarasov were named vice-captains.

Player of the Month
In September 2012, the club started a monthly poll among Loko fans in the social networks to name the best player of the month. The award went to:
Vedran Ćorluka (September 2012),
Andrey Yeshchenko (October 2012),
Dame N'Doye (November 2012),
Kamil Mullin (March 2013),
Dmitri Tarasov (April 2013),
Aleksandr Samedov (May 2013).

References

FC Lokomotiv Moscow seasons
Lokomotiv Moscow